GKL may refer to:

Gleneagles Kuala Lumpur
IATA code for Great Keppel Island Airport, on Great Keppel Island, Queensland, Australia